TVF Pitchers is an Indian Hindi-language web series created by The Viral Fever (TVF) and developed by Arunabh Kumar. It features Naveen Kasturia, Arunabh Kumar, Jitendra Kumar and Abhay Mahajan along with Maanvi Gagroo and Riddhi Dogra.

The first season, which went on to receive much acclaim, was written by Biswapati Sarkar and was directed by Amit Golani. The story follows four friends, Naveen, Jitu, Yogi and Mandal, who quit their jobs in order to develop their own start-up company. The season consisted of five episodes and premiered online on TVF's content portal TVFPlay on 10 June 2015. A week later, on 17 June, it premiered on YouTube. The season finale premiered on TVFPlay on 30 August 2015. The show was highly appreciated and has since developed a cult status.

For the second season, the series moved to ZEE5 as a part of its original programming. The series has been written by Arunabh Kumar, Prashant Kumar, Shubham Sharma and Talha Siddiqui. It has been directed by Vaibhav Bundhoo and  Arunabh Kumar. The story is set years after the end of season 1 and traces the story of the same startup that was founded by the four friends. It premiered on December 23, 2022.

Premise 
Four friends — Naveen Bansal, Jitendra "Jitu" Maheshwari, Yogendra "Yogi" Kumar and Saurabh Mandal — enter the business world by launching their own start-up company. Naveen becomes angry for not getting a project from the company in which he works, gets drunk and resigns. He faces a dilemma when he is offered a position in a branch office located in Beijing. He leaves for the airport but upon reaching there he realizes that he is not destined for routine jobs. At the same time, he receives news of his "B-Plan" reaching the final of the NASSCOM start-up conclave. This sets off a chain of events in which the four rediscover what they really want in life, and face challenges in getting their start-up idea off the ground.

Cast

Production
After the release of the first trailer, the show's premise was compared to that of the American TV show Silicon Valley. However, when the pilot premiered, viewers realized this was not the case. Arunabh Kumar, founder and CEO of The Viral Fever, told The Huffington Post that if there's an American TV show that did inspire Pitchers – not in content but in spirit – it is the HBO drama Entourage about a young Hollywood star on the rise.

Episodes

Season 1

Season 2

Soundtrack 

For the original soundtrack for TVF Pitchers, The Viral Fever roped in Vaibhav Bundhoo who was a part of the media's previous series Permanent Roommates, after the overwhelming reception of the series. It consists of 15 original compositions created, produced and mixed by  Bundhoo and was released in a separate jukebox format on YouTube on 5 September 2015. However the music album for the original series was released on 2 February 2017, as it took more time for mastering the tracks for streaming platform.

Release 
Arunabh Kumar, who co-starred in TVF Pitchers and also the founder of TVF, announced that the series will release in May 2015. The official teaser was released on 3 April 2015, confirming the said date. However, the 4-minute teaser trailer of the series, which released on 27 May 2015, announced a new release date of 10 June 2015.

The first episode of the series was released on The Viral Fever's official media streaming platform TVF Play, and a week later, on 17 June 2015, it was uploaded on YouTube. Each episodes were released within a three-week window so as to upload simultaneously in TVF Play and YouTube. TVF Pitchers is the first ever web series to be released directly through TVF Play with its inception in early 2015. The last episode of the series was unveiled on TVF on 30 August 2015 and in YouTube a day later.

After The Viral Fever announced a new Tamil streaming platform titled TVF Machi, in order to cover the audience across the regional market, the makers released the dubbed Tamil version of the series on 6 October 2017. In late 2016, it was reported that the second season of the series was reported to be in the process, however was not confirmed officially.

In February 2021, TVF released a video to announce their line up for 2021 on their YouTube channel. The video consist of clips from the upcoming TVF series as well as old clips from the existing series hinting their further seasons. The climax of the video shows an archive footage from the first season of TVF Pitchers teasing the possibility of the second season.

In June 2021, the OTT platform ZEE5 announced a content partnership with TVF to exclusively stream its upcoming shows including the second season of TVF Pitchers.

Season 2 was officially announced on 5th December 2022 and the trailer was released on 13th December 2022. The second season of the show premiered on 23rd December 2022 on ZEE5.

Reception

Season 1 

The first season of TVF Pitchers has been well received by the internet audience The first episode has more than 7.7 million views.

Season 2 
The second season received a largely positive response. "Pitchers 2 is a worthy sequel, thanks to its true-to-life characters and themes of start-up business challenges," noted the Times of India. The Hindustan Times wrote, "And when it comes to getting it right, Pitchers season 2 doesn’t shy away from serving bitter reality without a sweetener.".

References

External links 
 
 
Pitchers S2 on ZEE5

2015 web series debuts
Hindi-language web series
Indian comedy web series
TVF Play Shows
YouTube original programming
2010s YouTube series